The Alliance of Congolese Democrats is a political party in the Democratic Republic of Congo. The party won 4 out of 500 seats in the parliamentary elections. In the 19 January 2007 Senate elections, the party won out 1 of 108 seats.

References

Political parties in the Democratic Republic of the Congo